Chen Hsueh-sheng (Foochow Romanized: Dìng Siók-sĕng; born 1 January 1952) is a Taiwanese politician. He was the Magistrate of Lienchiang County from 2001 to 2009, and has represented Lienchiang County in the Legislative Yuan since 2012.

Education
Chen studied at National Feng Yuan Commercial High School.

Political career
Chen won the 2001 Lienchiang County magistracy election on 1 December 2001 as a People First Party candidate and took office on 20 December 2001. He was reelected in 2005 and began his second term on 20 December 2005. He contested the 2012 legislative elections as an independent and became a representative of Lienchiang County.

He was to rejoin the PFP in 2016 if the Kuomintang lost that year's presidential election, but instead sought Kuomintang membership outright in 2015.

References

External links

 
 

1952 births
Living people
Magistrates of Lienchiang County
Kuomintang Members of the Legislative Yuan in Taiwan
People First Party (Taiwan) politicians
Members of the 8th Legislative Yuan
Members of the 9th Legislative Yuan
Lienchiang County Members of the Legislative Yuan
Members of the 10th Legislative Yuan